The Republican Stadium was a multi-purpose stadium in Chişinău, Moldova. It was used mostly for football matches.  The stadium held 8,084 people, was built in 1952 and demolished in 2007.

In 1986 was held the final of Soviet League Cup between  Dnipro Dnipropetrovsk and Zenit Leningrad.

Notes 

Sports venues completed in 1952
Sports venues built in the Soviet Union
Football venues in the Soviet Union
Athletics (track and field) venues in the Soviet Union
Football venues in Moldova
Athletics (track and field) venues in Moldova
Multi-purpose stadiums
Sports venues demolished in 2007
1952 establishments in the Soviet Union
2007 disestablishments in Moldova
Buildings and structures in Chișinău
Demolished buildings and structures in Moldova